The 1884 United States presidential election in Alabama took place on November 4, 1884, as part of the nationwide presidential election. Alabama voters chose ten representatives, or electors, to the Electoral College, who voted for president and vice president.

Alabama was won by Grover Cleveland, the 28th governor of New York, (D–New York), running with the former governor of Indiana Thomas A. Hendricks, with 60.37% of the popular vote, against Secretary of State James G. Blaine (R-Maine), running with Senator John A. Logan, with 38.69% of the vote.

Results

See also 
 United States presidential elections in Alabama

References 

Alabama
1884
1884 Alabama elections